El Quebrachal is a town and municipality in Salta Province in northwestern Argentina.

Notable people
Claudio Acosta, footballer

References

Populated places in Salta Province